() is a variety of hoe dishes consisting of blanched vegetables, seafoods, or offals. Sukhoe is usually dipped in chojang, the mixture made of gochujang and vinegar.

History 
A number of sukhoe varieties are listed in a 17th-century cookbook, Jubangmun.

Varieties 

  – Blanched green sea fingers are chopped finely, and served with chojang (dipping sauce made with gochujang and vinegar).
  – Blanched dureup (angelica-tree shoots) are served with chojang. 
  or  – Fresh fish, boiled beef lung, sea cucumber, abalone are sliced, mixed with silpa (thread scallions), Indian chrysanthemum leaves, pyogo and seogi mushrooms, and coated with starch slurry, blanched, and served in sesame milk.
  – Aubergines are blanched in salt water, sliced thinly, and served with mustard sauce.
  – Blanched or raw minari (Oenanthe javanica) is served with chojang.
  – Fresh giant octopus is skinned, blanched, and served with chojang.
  – Young leaves of brasenia is blanched, soaked in cold water, strained, and served with chojang.

Gallery

See also
 Ganghoe

References 

Korean seafood dishes
Korean vegetable dishes